Antonio Aguilar Chastellain (born 7 April 1960) is a Spanish water polo player. He competed in the 1980 and 1984 Summer Olympics.

Notes

References

External links
 

1960 births
Living people
Water polo players at the 1980 Summer Olympics
Water polo players at the 1984 Summer Olympics
Spanish male water polo players
Olympic water polo players of Spain
Water polo players from Barcelona
20th-century Spanish people